Northern Lights Festival Boréal is an annual summer music festival in Sudbury, Ontario. It is one of Canada's oldest, continuous music festivals, having been staged every year since 1972 until the Covid-19 pandemic. Only the Mariposa Folk Festival is older, but it was not staged in 1980-81.

The bilingual festival is held at Bell Park, including the Grace Hartman Amphitheatre, on the shores of Ramsey Lake. A diverse program of music is presented in a variety of genres, including arts, crafts and children's entertainment, and featuring a mix of national, international and Northern Ontario artists and performers. Musicians at the festival typically participate in concert performances and workshop sessions, collaborating with several other musicians.

In addition to the main festival, the organizing committee also sponsors concerts and other cultural events in the city throughout the year. During the festival weekend, a lineup of artists also performs downtown at the Townehouse.

The festival is usually held on the first weekend in July, although it was postponed until the last weekend of the month in 1988 to serve as the cultural festival for the 1988 World Junior Championships in Athletics, which were held in the city. Most commonly held over three days from Friday to Sunday, at various times in its history the festival has also taken place over one, two or four days.

History
The festival was founded by a group of volunteers in 1972. It incorporated in 1975 at which time artists also began to be paid for performing. The festival has always been multicultural, including Ukrainian, Indian and Croatian Canadians at the first festival, and Indigenous artists since the third. 

Among the highlights over the years: 

 In the 1970s, Colin Linden, then 14 years old, appeared at the festival.
 Canadian folk musician Stan Rogers wrote one of his most famous songs, "Barrett's Privateers," while at the festival. The song was written for a collaborative performance session with the band, Friends of Fiddler's Green.
 In the 1980s, the festival was one of the first major venues to book Shania Twain, then 10 years old.
 The 1990 event saw the first collaborative performance by folk musicians James Keelaghan and Oscar Lopez, who later recorded two Juno Award-nominated albums together as the Compadres.
 In 1992, the festival was profiled in the TVOntario series, Putting On the Arts.
 In 1999, pop singer Amanda Marshall announced a concert in the city on a date that conflicted with the festival. The controversy was resolved when Marshall's promoters offered a special promotional pass that enabled ticketholders to attend both events. Nevertheless, attendance at the festival fell below expectations, leaving a deficit. The following year, the festival recovered by offering a smaller program.
 In 2017, the festival expanded its three-day schedule with a Thursday night performance devoted exclusively to Indigenous music.
 In 2020-21, the festival was cancelled for the first time in its history due to the COVID-19 pandemic in Canada.
 The festival celebrated its 50th anniversary in 2022.

Festival artistic directors have included Scott Merrifield, Vickie McGauley, John Closs, Claude Faucon, Paul Loewenberg, and Max Merrifield.

Awards
The Jackie Washington Award is presented each year for distinguished contribution to Northern Ontario's cultural life. Past recipients have included Robert Paquette, Ken Whiteley, Daniel Bédard, Paul Dunn and Charlie Angus. The award is named for Jackie Washington, a blues musician who appeared at the festival 25 times between the festival's inauguration in 1972 and Washington's death in 2009.

Also awarded annually is the Bernie Melanson Volunteer Award, named after one of the festival's founding members and given to individuals or groups for longstanding or exceptional service to the festival.

Performers

1980
CANO, Tom Rush, Stan Rogers

1983
Scott Merritt, Lauri Conger and Lorraine Segato, The Nylons, The Bop Cats, Joe Hall, Nancy White, Eritage, Shirley Eikhard, Richard Séguin, Robert Paquette, CANO, Paul Dunn, Daisy DeBolt, Jacko Chartrand

1990
James Keelaghan, Oscar Lopez, Tom Paxton, Josephine, Loreena McKennitt

1995
Ashley MacIsaac, Kashtin, Nadjiwan, The Wailing Aztecs, The Shuffle Demons, Stephen Fearing, Eric Nagler

1997
Blue Rodeo, Bob Wiseman, Universal Honey, Change of Heart, The Pursuit of Happiness, Bob Snider, Fred Eaglesmith, Pacande, The Wailing Aztecs, Nadjiwan, Les Chaizes Muzikales

1998
Bruce Cockburn, Natalie MacMaster, Rheostatics

1999
Mackeel, Buckwheat Zydeco, Grievous Angels, Kim Stockwood

2000
The Arrogant Worms, Rita Chiarelli, The Corndogs, Alun Piggins, Carlos del Junco, Konflit Dramatik, Ruby Craig, The Rockin' Highliners, Debbie Danbrook, Hank Engel and the Hoosier Daddies, No Reservations, Darlene

2004
The Arrogant Worms, BeeBop Cowboys, Broche à Foin, Kevin Closs, Sarah Craig, Véronic DiCaire, Brian Dunn, Fred Eaglesmith, Grievous Angels, The Havocs, Colin James, Kingpins, Konflit Dramatik, Corb Lund, Kate Maki, Matapat, Mondo Idols, Ox, Pilate, Andy Stochansky, Sweetwater, The Wailin' Jennys, Verge

2007
Ron Sexsmith, Leahy, Blackie and the Rodeo Kings, Peter Case, Les Breastfeeders, Oh Susanna, Peter Elkas, Ox, Kim Barlow, Torngat

2008
Kate Maki, Old Man Luedecke, Nathan Lawr, Two Hours Traffic, Daniel Bélanger, Ian Tamblyn, David Francey, Miracle Fortress, The Sadies, Don McLean

2009
Serena Ryder, Bob Wiseman, Joel Plaskett, Jenn Grant, Bob Snider, Angie Nussey, Stéphane Paquette, J. P. Cormier, Norman Foote, Mr. Something Something

2011
Broken Social Scene, The Weakerthans, Lunch At Allen's, Ron Hynes, J. P. Cormier, Ladies of the Canyon

2012
Daniel Lanois, Steven Page, Joel Plaskett, The Good Lovelies, The Hidden Cameras

2013
Serena Ryder, Kathleen Edwards, Buck 65, Lynn Miles, Caracol, Elisapie, Swamperella, Cindy Cook

2014
Amélie, Annie Lou, Bustamento, Bruce Cockburn, Lemon Bucket Orkestra, Melbourne Ska Orchestra, Barry Miles, Stéphane Paquette, Red Moon Road, Crystal Shawanda, The Strumbellas, Tokyo Police Club, Wintersleep

2015
Fanny Bloom, Big Tobacco & The Pickers, Billy John & The Irish Wake, The Bombadils, Duncan Cameron, Cello Tales, J. P. Cormier, Quique Escamilla, Five Alarm Funk, Sarah Harmer, Hello Holiday, House of David Gang, Jayme Stone's Lomax Project, Kobo Town, Lee Harvey Osmond, Dan Mangan, Melbourne Ska Orchestra, Mimi O'Bonsawin, Lisa Marie Naponse, Le Paysagiste, Pistol George Warren, Les Poules à Colin, Adonis Puentes, Reuben and the Dark, Scarlett Jane, Ben Sures, Tuba Boy, The Wild Geese

2016
Afrikelektro, The Amazing René, Bahamas, Mélanie Brulée, Collective Roots, Cindy Cook, Digging Roots, Brian Dunn, Paul Dunn, Fagroongala, Martine Fortin, Matt Foy, Anique Granger, Gypsy Kumbia Orchestra, Jennifer Holub, Les Hotêsses d’Hilaire, Hugh Jazz, François Lemieux, A. David MacKinnon, Natalie MacMaster and Donnell Leahy, Kate Maki, Mandala, Minotaurs, Murder Murder, Orkestar Kriminal, Steven Page, Pretty Archie, Chuck Roberts, Sheesham & Lotus & Son, Frederick Squire, Jeff Stewart and Community Drums, Rose-Erin Stokes, Sun K, Dwayne Trudeau, Josh Turnbull, Union Duke

2017
Aerialists, The Ape-ettes, Barry Miles and the Congregation, Bboy Redsky, Bixiga 70, Black Bull Moose Singers, La Bronze, Christian Cirelli, Dr. Tom's Travelling Medicine Show, M. D. Dunn, Ever-Lovin' Jug Band, Les Frérots Rochers, Stephanie Fyfe, Emmanuel Gasser, Louis-Philippe Gingras, Sarah King Gold, Nico Glaude, Joy Harjo, Hidden Roots Collective, The Jerry Cans, Jonathan Byrd and the Pickup Cowboys, Bryden Gwiss Kiwenzie, Mclean, Miss Sassoeur & Les Sassys, Mob Bounce, Music by Jake, No Reservations, Fred Penner, Dale Pepin, Plugged Nickel String Band, Quantum Tangle, Rabbit and Bear Paws, Jenny Ritter, Don Ross, Buffy Sainte-Marie, Samantha Martin and Delta Sugar, Andy Shauf, Nick Sherman, Ansley Simpson, Rae Spoon, Shotgun Jimmie, Annie Sumi, Leonard Sumner, Chris Thériault, Trad, A Tribe Called Red, Tuns, The Turbans, Whitehorse, Clayton Windatt, Yukon Blonde

2018
Afrikana Soul Sister, Afro Madness Drum Troupe, Alvvays, Andrew Queen and the Campfire Crew, Arkells, C.R. Avery, Les Barricades, BBBRTHR, Seth Bernard, Binaeshee-Quae, Black Bull Moose Singers, Bonsa, Aleksi Campagne, Canailles, Casper Skulls, David Cordero, Aron d'Alesio, Russell deCarle, Les Deuxluxes, Cécile Doo-Kingué, Matt Foy, Frank Deresti and the Lake Effect, Fresh Kils & Vekked, Jane's Party, Connie Kaldor, Doctor Nativo, Guitars Alive Quartet, Hellnback, Richard Inman, Iskwé, JoPo and the Rize, Julie and the Wrong Guys, King Abid, Kira May, The Keyframes, Édouard Landry, Abigail Lapell, Lisa Leblanc, Lee Harvey Osmond, Paul Loewenberg and Richard Mende, Pat Maloney, Mama's Broke, Rodney Meilleur, Mickey O'Brien, Murder Murder, NiLLa & Ghettosocks, Orlando Julius and Afrosoundz, Joel Plaskett and Bill Plaskett, Donné Roberts, Shadowy Men on a Shadowy Planet, Sheesham & Lotus & Son, Sulfur City, Team T&J, Mara Tremblay, Laetitia Zonzambé

2019
The Almighty Rhombus, Bedouin Soundclash, Boogat, Kevin Breit, Brooke Bruce, Basia Bulat, The Burning Hell, Duncan Cameron, Eric Clancy, Kevin Closs, Jean-Paul De Roover, Cris Derksen, Fred Eaglesmith and Tif Ginn, ECHLO, Nick Ferrio, Eva Foote, Half Moon Run, Haviah Mighty, Jennifer Holub, Jane's Party, Jennis, K'naan, Mélissa Laveaux, Céleste Lévis, Magoo, Mayhemingways, Rodney Meilleur, Hannah Shira Naiman, Safia Nolin, Oh Geronimo, Pop Mach!ne, William Prince, Rayannah, Sam Roberts, Shaky Stars, Sheesham & Lotus & Son, Al Simmons, Ansley Simpson, Leanne Betasamosake Simpson, Ben Sures, Trapment, David Dino White, Jojo Worthington, Zeus

2022
a l l i e, Amandine et Rosalie, Balaklava Blues, Begonia, Bombino, Born Ruffians, Bryden Gwiss Kiwenzie, Casper Skulls, Cassidy Houston, Celeigh Cardinal, Clay and Friends, David Laronde, Gurpreet Chana, Harvey King & The Grindstone, Hezekiah Procter & The Hash House Serenaders, Ian Tamblyn, Judy Collins, Julie Katrinette, Lemon Bucket Orkestra, Lex Leosis, Leyla McCalla, Lillian Allen, Myka 9, Paul Collins’ Beat, Rabbit & Bear Paws, Robert Paquette, Sharon & Randi, Spencer Burton, St. Paul & The Broken Bones, The New Pornographers, The Weather Station, Wax Mannequin, Zal Sissokho

See also
Historic rock festivals
Music festivals in Canada

References

External links

 Northern Lights Festival Boréal official website

Music festivals in Ontario
Festivals in Greater Sudbury
Folk festivals in Canada
Music festivals established in 1972
Rock festivals in Canada